is a Justice of the Supreme Court of Japan. He was appointed on 13 February 2012, succeeding Kohei Nasu on the Third Petty Bench. He passed the bar exam in 1968, received his LLB (in both Private Law and Public Law programs) from the University of Tokyo in 1969, and his LLM degree from Harvard Law School in 1976. Before joining the Supreme Court, he held a number of high-profile positions in the Japanese Federation of Bar Associations ((JFBA)) and was a co-founder/partner of Tokei Partners. He reportedly enjoys pottery, rakugo, and legal dramas.

Honours
 Grand Cordon of the Order of the Rising Sun (2018)

References

University of Tokyo alumni
Supreme Court of Japan justices
Harvard Law School alumni
20th-century Japanese lawyers
1947 births
Living people
Grand Cordons of the Order of the Rising Sun
21st-century Japanese judges